Abingdon School is a day and boarding independent school for boys in Abingdon-on-Thames, Oxfordshire, England. The twentieth oldest independent British school, it celebrated its 750th anniversary in 2006. The school was described as "highly selective, strongly academic" in The Tatler School Guide.

History 
The date of Abingdon's foundation is unclear. Some believe the school to have been founded prior to the 12th century by the Benedictine monks of Abingdon Abbey, with a legal document of 1100 listing Richard the Pedagogue as the first headmaster. From its early years, the school used a room in St Nicolas' Church, which itself was built between 1121 and 1184.

The school now takes its anniversary from the earliest surviving reference to the school – 1256 – a charter of Abingdon Abbey recording an endowment by Abbot John de Blosneville for the support of thirteen poor scholars. In the past though, the school considered itself as having been founded by John Roysse in 1563. This led to the unusual circumstance whereby the school celebrated its 400th anniversary in 1963, and then its 750th in 2006.

By the time of Blosneville's endowment in 1256, the school had moved to a couple of rooms in Stert Street with a house for boarders at 3 Stert Street under the charge of a Dionysia Mundy. With John Roysse's re-endowment of 1563, the school moved to a site south of the Abbey gateway. Roysse was a prosperous mercer in the City of London, and through this association the school has received substantial benefactions from the Worshipful Company of Mercers. The name Roysse's School was commonly used until the 1960s.

After the dissolution of Abingdon Abbey in 1538, the school passed through a difficult phase: the sixteenth century endowments by Old Abingdonians attempted to overcome the loss of monastic support. Thomas Tesdale, who had been a pupil in 1563, made provision for an Usher to teach six poor scholars from the Borough of Abingdon and offered support for thirteen Abingdon students to study at Oxford. This benefaction eventually developed into Pembroke College in 1624 by the re-foundation of Broadgates Hall.

The six poor scholars, known as Bennett Boys, or colloquially as the Gown Boys owing to their dress, were financed by another Old Abingdonian, William Bennett. Between 1609 and 1870 the school maintained a dual management: the Headmaster, appointed by the Mayor and Corporation, and the Tesdale Usher and Bennett Scholars appointed by the Master and Governors of Christ's Hospital, Abingdon. Despite being penalised during and after the English Civil War for its royalist and Anglican tendencies the school survived and achieved somewhat of a revival under headmaster Robert Jennings (1657–1683). In 1671, ten boys were expelled after they refused to attend Anglican services at St Helen's church.

The school experienced a successful period during the 18th century under headmaster Thomas Woods (1716–1753), known as "Flogging Tom". At the turn of the century, the school entered a period of decline under the leadership of the "incompetent" headmaster Dr. John Lempriere. As a consequence, Pembroke College, Oxford, used the Oxford University Act 1854 as an excuse to cut its links with the school.

The current school site in the Victorian quarter of Abingdon, adjacent to Albert Park, was designed by Edwin Dolby and was built from 1870. Its architecture was described in The Builder that year as externally "of a simple character, the local material of red brick and tile being the chief material employed, relieved by bands of Bath stone". Extensions to the 1870 buildings were added in 1880. In 1901, a chapel and gymnasium were built. The adjacent Waste Court property was acquired in 1928. The Science School came in 1952. In 1963, to mark the Quartercentenary of the school's re-foundation, the big schoolroom was re-ordered as the Grundy Library (opened by Princess Margaret), together with erection of further buildings east of the Science Wing, the whole becoming known as Big School. In 1980, the Amey Theatre and Arts' Centre was opened and the Sports Centre opened in 1984. Mercers Court was opened in 1994 by the Chancellor of Oxford University and Visitor of Pembroke College, Baron Jenkins of Hillhead.

On 4 October 2008, the newly completed Sports Centre was opened by MP Kate Hoey. This multimillion-pound project took 5 years to complete and increased the floorspace of the school by 40%. Plans for the complex were formally launched by Princess Anne on 15 September 2006.

In September 2010, Felicity Lusk, formerly headmistress of Oxford High School for Girls, a GDST school, replaced Mark Turner as Head of Abingdon. She became the first female Head of a boys' boarding public school. A recent addition to the School's facilities is a new Yang Science Centre by Hopkins Architects. Opened in October 2015, housing 21 laboratories, study areas and prep rooms. The previous science building was refurbished in 2016 with new rooms for history, geography and classics and new sports facilities were installed at Tilsley Park. In 2016, Lusk was replaced by Michael Windsor.

In 2018, a new development called Beech Court, housing a new library, Sixth Form Centre, and art facilities was completed and opened in November. In 2020, a further development called Faringdon Lodge (containing Economics, Business and Computer Science) was completed. In 2022, major work began on extending the boarding houses of Austin House, Crescent House and School House.

The Good Schools Guide called it "an impressive school which does what it sets out to do well", also noting that it was "likely to increase in popularity because of its location and increasingly sparkly achievements", while The Times described it as "an elite boys' boarding school".

Students and houses
As of 2002, the school has approximately 1,040 pupils aged 11–18, of whom around 135 are boarders. The school is split into 10 houses, one of which is for boys in years 7 & 8 (Lower School, around 135 boys), three of which are for boarders and dayboys in year 9 and above, and six for day boys in year 9 and above. With the exception of Lower School, School House, Austin House  and Crescent House, the houses are named after their current Housemasters and are thus prone to change. Boys in Lower School have a pastoral tutor within the house for two years before being redistributed to the 9 "senior" houses when they move into year 9 and are joined by c.100 boys from other schools. In years 9 to 13 (3rd year to Upper 6th), they have the same housemaster, but usually three different pastoral tutors, specialising in 3rd year, the GCSE years and then the Sixth Form years, though this is subject to the particular house and change.

Extracurricular activities

The school offers over 130 extracurricular activities, known as the "Other Half" (of the syllabus).

Sport
Abingdon's core sports are rowing, rugby union, football, field hockey and cricket. In recent years, the school has won the Princess Elizabeth Challenge Cup at Henley Royal Regatta three years running in 2011, 2012 and 2013, and has reached the later stages of the Daily Mail U18 rugby cup whilst also gaining places in the last four of the HMC national 20/20 cricket competition. Sport is compulsory at Abingdon School and each student must compete in at least two sessions per week. The boat club has documentary evidence indicating rowing was a school activity in 1830. Roysse's School Rowing Club (1840) became the Abingdon School Boat Club.

Non-sporting activities 
The Debating Society is the school's oldest non-sporting society, founded in 1904. Abingdon takes part in a variety of national debating, public speaking and model United Nations competitions, Abingdon were national champions of the 2009 European Youth Parliament competition. The society also holds black-tie dinner debates with girls' schools, including the School of St Helen and St Katharine, Wycombe Abbey and Westonbirt School. The School's Edmund and Roysse Societies hold talks for several times a term, inviting speakers to lecture on a variety of subjects.

The school's publications include The Abingdonian (founded 1880), termly Abingdon News and the annual Griffen for alumni. Pupil publications include Griffenomics, Words and That, The Martlet, The Polyglot, The Blazer and a satirical termly magazine called The Pupil Voice Report.

Abingdon has a Combined Cadet Force, which consists of RAF and Army sections, the CCF is voluntary but is the largest non sporting activity. The contingent's RAF section won the 2002 Ground Training Competition (South East) at RAF Uxbridge, Middlesex. The shooting team won the National final that same year.

The Abingdon Film Unit (AFU), formed in 2003, exists as part of the "Other Half" and has created over 200 films. Many films have been shown at festivals and have won awards.

Academic 
At A Level, the 2017 A*–A percentage averaged 63.3% At GCSE, the A* percentage in 2017 was 60.2% and the A*–A percentage 86.3%. In 2020, 44% of GCSE grades were grade 9, while the 9–7 percentage was 87.7%.

At GCSE, most of the courses followed are at the iGCSE level (international GCSE) and all examinations are taken in year 11 (5th year), i.e. there is no "early" take of qualifications even for top sets. The top two Maths sets at GCSE follow the iGCSE and Additional Maths qualifications. In sixth form, A Levels are followed to AS and then A2 level, but following the reforms put in place under Michael Gove, the school decided that from September 2015 it would follow a linear system (i.e. courses will be completed over two years) and not offer the stand-alone AS qualification. Some departments offer the Cambridge pre-U course instead of the traditional A Level.

Celebrations 
The "Foundation Dinner", to honour the school's founders and benefactors, is held once a year towards the end of Lent term. It is normally attended by Abingdon Town Councillors, supporters of the school, governors, famous OAs, school prefects and upper sixth scholars.

Headteachers (since 1600)

Notable alumni (12th – 21st century)

Further reading 
 St Nicholas Abingdon and Other Papers, Arthur Edwin Preston (1929 and 1971)
 Abingdon School 1870–1970 (1970)
 A Song on a Bugle Blown, Donald Willis (1983)
 A History of Rowing at Abingdon School 1840–1990, R G Mortimer (1990)
 The Martlet and the Griffen, Thomas Hinde and Michael St John Parker (1997)
 A Record of Tesdale Ushers & Bennett Scholars 1609–1870, Nigel Hammond (2004)

See also
 The Master Singers, a vocal group in the 1960s formed by teachers at the school
List of English and Welsh endowed schools (19th century)

References

External links 

 School website
 Christ's Hospital of Abingdon
 St Nicholas Church
 Profile at the Good Schools Guide

Abingdon-on-Thames
Member schools of the Headmasters' and Headmistresses' Conference
Church of England private schools in the Diocese of Oxford
11th-century establishments in England
Educational institutions established in the 11th century
Abingdon School
Boarding schools in Oxfordshire